Gloria Ortiz may refer to
 Gloria Stella Diaz Ortiz, Colombian politician, born 1964
 Gloria Stella Ortiz Delgado, Colombian jurist, born 1969
 Gloria Ortiz-Hernandez, Colombian artist, born 1943